The Lifetime Achievement Award in Translation, awarded by the Translators Association of China (TAC) since 2006, is one of the most prestigious translation prizes in China.

List of recipients

References

Chinese literary awards
Translation awards
2006 establishments in China
Awards established in 2006
Literary awards honoring lifetime achievement